Dietmar Pegam (born 11 June 1968) is an Austrian football midfielder and later manager.

References

1968 births
Living people
Austrian footballers
SK Sturm Graz players
Grazer AK players
Association football midfielders
Austrian Football Bundesliga players
Austrian football managers
Grazer AK managers